The 1978 Balkan Bulgarian Tupolev Tu-134 crash was an accident that occurred on 16 March 1978, when a Balkan Bulgarian Airlines Tupolev Tu-134 airliner on an international flight from Sofia Airport to Warsaw Airport crashed. All passengers and crew died in the crash. As of 2023, it remains the deadliest accident in Bulgarian aviation history. The exact cause of the crash remains unknown.

Aircraft 
The aircraft Tupolev Tu-134, tail number LZ-TUB, was produced in 1968 by the Kharkiv State Aircraft Manufacturing Company. It belonged to Balkan Bulgarian Airlines, and had 72 passenger seats and room for seven crew. The flight in question was piloted by Captain Hristo Hristov.

Accident 
It turned again to 270 degrees before it began an abnormal descent. The aircraft crashed 10 minutes from takeoff near the village of Gabare, close to Byala Slatina, 130 km northeast of Sofia, killing all 73 people on board. The nature of the emergency and whether the aircraft was under control at the moment of impact were never established.

After the crash, the Bulgarian Army quickly arrived at the scene, and sealed it off. The investigation performed afterwards was superficial. The official cause given by the Bulgarian authorities was a "malfunction of electrical installation". The accident was quickly forgotten, with no further investigations being conducted. The haste with which the disaster was "forgotten" and the superficial investigation that was carried out raised doubts. This sparked speculation as to the real cause of the crash. One version of the event claimed that the Tu-134 collided with a MiG-21 of the Bulgarian Air Force. Another version assumed that the aircraft was shot down mistakenly by the Bulgarian anti-aircraft defense system. These claims are driven by the fact that there was a Warsaw Pact military base in the area.

Victims 
The victims of the crash were 37 Polish passengers, 27 Bulgarian passengers, two British passengers and seven crew members.

Among the victims were members of the Polish national track cycling team (Tadeusz Włodarczyk, Witold Stachowiak, Marek Kolasa, Krzysztof Otocki and Jacek Zdaniuk) and members of the Bulgarian national rhythmic gymnastics team (Valentina Kirilova, Snezhana Mikhailova, Albena Petrova, Sevdalina Popova and Rumiana Stefanova with their coach Julieta Shishmanova). Other victims included the Polish Vice-Minister of Culture  and Bulgarian footballer Georgi Dimitrov.

Commemoration 
A marble monument located in a gorge near the village of Gabare commemorates the accident and its victims. It is placed in hard-to-reach terrain and no path leads towards it. It reads "The living owe it to those who can no longer speak to tell their story."

References 
UK CAA Document CAA 429 World Airline Accident Summary (ICAO Summary 4/80)

External links 

Aviation accidents and incidents in 1978
Accidents and incidents involving the Tupolev Tu-134
Aviation accidents and incidents in Bulgaria
Airliner accidents and incidents with an unknown cause
Balkan Bulgarian Airlines accidents and incidents
1978 in Bulgaria
March 1978 events in Europe
1978 disasters in Bulgaria